Evren Erdeniz (born 3 April 1983) is a Turkish former football player who played as an attacking midfielder.

References

1983 births
Living people
Turkish footballers
Association football midfielders
MKE Ankaragücü footballers
Ankaraspor footballers
Göztepe S.K. footballers
Karşıyaka S.K. footballers
Pazarspor footballers
Süper Lig players
TFF Second League players
TFF Third League players